Aliabad-e Dizgoran (also Romanized as ‘Alīābād-e Dīzgorān; also known as ‘Alīābād, Dizgaran, Dīzgerān, Qal’a Aliabad, and Qal‘eh ‘Aliābād) is a village in Harasam Rural District, Homeyl District, Eslamabad-e Gharb County, Kermanshah Province, Iran. At the 2006 census, its population was 245, in 56 families.

References 

Populated places in Eslamabad-e Gharb County